The 1998 Pep Boys 400K was the sixth round of the 1998 Indy Racing League. The race was held on July 19, 1998 at the  Dover Downs International Speedway in Dover, Delaware. It was the second Indy car race held at this track, and the first since the 1969 Delaware 200.

Report

Qualifying

Two laps qualifying. The worst lap from any of the drivers are unknown. 

  Had an engine failure in his warm-up lap. He was allowed to start the race at the back of the field.
  Named for the ride after qualifying. He was allowed to start the race at the back of the field.

Failed to qualify or withdrew
 Eliseo Salazar for Riley & Scott Cars - crashed in practice on Friday July 17 and was hospitalized with a broken right arm, hip, leg and pelvis. Replaced by  Scott Harrington.
 Buzz Calkins for Bradley Motorsports - after losing an engine on practice, his team decided to sit out for the weekend and also to withdraw for the next event at Charlotte to regain competitiveness.
 Robbie Buhl for Team Menard - withdrawn prior to the start of practice by his team as a protest after John Menard accused A. J. Foyt of "skullduggery" during qualifying at New Hampshire. He was also withdrawn for the Charlotte race.
 J. J. Yeley R for Sinden Racing Services - withdrawn prior to the start of practice by his team in support of Menard's protest.
 Stan Wattles for Metro Racing Systems - the team withdrew prior to the start of practice to concentrate on its testing programme.

Race

Race Statistics
Lead changes: 8 among 5 drivers

Standings after the race

Drivers' Championship standings

 Note: Only the top five positions are included for the standings.

References

External links
IndyCar official website

1998 in IndyCar
1998 in sports in Delaware